The Battle of Pirot took place during the Serbo-Bulgarian War between the 26th and 27 November, 1885 near the town of Pirot, Serbia.The battle opposed the Bulgarian Western Corps to the Serbian Nišava Army and ended with a Bulgarian victory and the signing of an armistice. The battle led to the treaty of Bucharest ending the Serbo-Bulgarian War restoring peace between the two countries.

Prelude
After the Bulgarian victory at the Battle of Slivnitsa, fought from 17-19 November 1885, the Bulgarian army counter-attacked. The Bulgarian troops defeated the Serbs at Gurgulyat (19 November) and Dragoman (22 November), and subsequently reached the city of Pirot, where the Serbian Nišava army occupied defensive positions in the hills to the east of the town.

The battle
On 26 November, the Bulgarians defeated the Serbian cover forces along the border and moved on to Pirot. At around 15:00 on the same day, the Bulgarian advanced guard engaged the enemy, first achieving success on the left flank of the front, after the detachment of Captain Popov had seized the heights of Divan and Cherni Vrah. On the right flank, the 10th Regiment of the Serbian Šumadija Division retreated followed by the two battalions sent to defend Pirot. During the skirmishes on the left flank, the Bulgarians had suffered 48 killed, 136 wounded and 27 missing, while the Serbians lost 67 soldiers, had 134 wounded and 85 captured. The Serbians were badly equipped and unprepared using second hand obsolete Russian artillery while the Bulgarian used modern German weaponry.

During the night of 27 November, the Serbs regrouped and at dawn managed to retake Pirot from the Bulgarians.  The column of Major Gudzhev attacked the Šumadija Division and the Bulgarians managed to push the Serbs to the river Temska. The retreat of the Šumadija Division forced the Drina Division to pull back as well and the Bulgarians pursued after them. On the left flank, the Bulgarians were also successful. The Serbs managed to hold on their position in the southern part of Pirot until the night. Later the Bulgarians, pushed the Serbs from the city and attack Serbian army positions west of the town of Pirot. The Serbians continued to hold a position to the south of the town till nightfall.

Aftermath
A day after the victory, the Bulgarian army prepared to continue its advance to the city of Niš, which was a target of Greater Bulgarian national project, but the Austro-Hungarian delegation in the Bulgarian capital made it clear that if the Bulgarian advance continued, Austria-Hungary would have intervened in the war on the side of Serbia. As result the same day an armistice was concluded.  The treaty of Bucharest on 3 March 1886 brought the brief war to an end and restored the prewar status quo.

Notes
a.  For Julian calendar was 14 and 15 November.

References

Sources
 Атанасов, Щ. и др. Българското военно изкуство през капитализма, София, 1959, Държавно военно издателство при МНО
 Димитров, И., Съединението 1885 - енциклопедичен справочник, София, 1985, Държавно издателство „д-р Петър Берон"
 Недевска, Е., Шанов, С. Сръбско-българската война 1885. Сборник спомени, София, 1985, Военно издателство
 Венедиков, Й., История на доброволците от Сръбско-българската война 1885 година, София, 1985, Издателство на отечествения фронт, стр. 181-190
 Христов, Х. и др. Сръбско-българската война 1885. Сборник документи, София, 1985, Военно издателство

Conflicts in 1885
Battles involving Bulgaria
Battles involving Serbia
1885 in Bulgaria
Serbo-Bulgarian War
1885 in Serbia
Pirot District
November 1885 events